Cigar Lake Airport  is located  south-west of Waterbury Lake, Saskatchewan, Canada in the Athabasca Basin. It serves the Cigar Lake Mine.

See also
List of airports in Saskatchewan

References

External links
Page about this airport on COPA's Places to Fly airport directory

Registered aerodromes in Saskatchewan